Lamyatt is a village and civil parish in the Mendip district of Somerset, England. The parish has a population of 183.

History

A square, Roman-period Celtic temple built in the late 3rd century, is situated a mile north-west of the parish on the summit of Lamyatt Beacon. It fell into disuse at the end of the Roman period and a small east-west building was constructed nearby. A small cemetery was radiocarbon dated to the early middle ages.

Lamyatt was recorded in the Domesday book as Lamieta meaning "the lamb's gate" from the Old English lamb and goat. The Abbot of Glastonbury Abbey owned the land and 5 hides (660 acres) were sublet to Nigel the Doctor.

The parish of Lamyatt was part of the Whitstone Hundred.

Governance

The parish council has responsibility for local issues, including setting an annual precept (local rate) to cover the council’s operating costs and producing annual accounts for public scrutiny. The parish council evaluates local planning applications and works with the local police, district council officers, and neighbourhood watch groups on matters of crime, security, and traffic. The parish council's role also includes initiating projects for the maintenance and repair of parish facilities, as well as consulting with the district council on the maintenance, repair, and improvement of highways, drainage, footpaths, public transport, and street cleaning. Conservation matters (including trees and listed buildings) and environmental issues are also the responsibility of the council.

The village falls within the Non-metropolitan district of Mendip, which was formed on 1 April 1974 under the Local Government Act 1972, having previously been part of Shepton Mallet Rural District, which is responsible for local planning and building control, local roads, council housing, environmental health, markets and fairs, refuse collection and recycling, cemeteries and crematoria, leisure services, parks, and tourism.

Somerset County Council is responsible for running the largest and most expensive local services such as education, social services, libraries, main roads, public transport, policing and  fire services, trading standards, waste disposal and strategic planning.

It is also part of the Wells county constituency represented in the House of Commons of the Parliament of the United Kingdom. It elects one Member of Parliament (MP) by the first past the post system of election, and was part of the South West England constituency of the European Parliament prior to Britain leaving the European Union in January 2020, which elected seven MEPs using the d'Hondt method of party-list proportional representation.

Religious sites

St Mary and St John Church dates from the 13th century, and has been designated by English Heritage as a grade II* listed building.

Notable people
John Copleston (1841–1918), cricketer and clergyman

References

External links

Lamyatt village web site

Villages in Mendip District
Civil parishes in Somerset